George Campbell Peery (October 28, 1873 – October 14, 1952) was an American Democratic politician, and was the 52nd governor of Virginia from 1934 to 1938. He became the second governor to be selected, at least partially, by the soon to be very powerful Byrd Organization, led by Senator Harry F. Byrd, Sr.

Early life and education
Peery was born in Cedar Bluff, in Tazewell County, Virginia, in the far southwest portion of the state. His father, Dr. James Peery, had been a surgeon in Derrick's Battalion of the Confederate States Army. He attended local schools while working on his father's farm and at the family store as well as the Tazewell County Clerk's office. He graduated from Emory & Henry College in 1894, winning medals in oratory and science. Peery then became principal of Tazewell High School for two years, before resigning and traveling to earn his LL.B. degree from Washington & Lee University in 1897 after a single year's study.

In 1907 he married Nancy Bane Gillespie, daughter of a prominent Tazewell attorney, Albert P. Gillespie, and they had three children, Albert G. Peery, George C. Peery, Jr., and Nancy Peery Whitley.

Career
Peery then returned to Southwestern Virginia to practice law, first setting up a practice in Tazewell, but after two years moving across the mountains to Wise, Virginia. he returned to Tazewell in 1915 to settle his father in law's estate and soon joined Gillespie's former partners A.C. Buchanan and Archibald C. Chapman to form Chapman, Peery, and Buchanan. he also began political involvement, chosen as Democratic elector at large on the Wilson-Marshall ticket in 1916 and in 1920 became chairman of the Ninth District Democratic committee.

Peery was elected to the Congress, representing the 9th Congressional district of Virginia in 1922. His victory was considered an early test of the Byrd Organization. Peery served from 1923 to 1929 and was a delegate to the Democratic National Convention in 1920 and 1924.

Peery resigned in 1929 to become a member of the State Corporation Commission, serving from 1929 to 1933. Then newly elected Senator Byrd approached him to run for governor in 1933. Peery accepted and won the November election.

As governor, he created unemployment insurance and, after the repeal of prohibition, he created Virginia's Alcohol Beverage Control board. In 1936, Governor Peery signed into law the act that created the Virginia State Parks.

After his retirement as governor, Peery joined the board of trustees of both Washington and Lee University and Hollins College.

Peery died in 1952, at the age of 78, two weeks short of his 79th birthday, in Richlands, Virginia. He was buried in Maplewood Cemetery in Tazewell, Virginia.

Electoral history

1933; Peery was elected Governor of Virginia with 73.74% of the vote, defeating Republican Fred W. McWane, Prohibitionist Andrew J. Dunning, Jr., Socialist George C. White, and Independents John Moffett Robinson and W. A. Rowe.

References

External links

 

|-

|-

|-

|-

1873 births
1952 deaths
Democratic Party members of the United States House of Representatives from Virginia
Democratic Party governors of Virginia
Emory and Henry College alumni
People from Tazewell County, Virginia
People from Wise, Virginia